The 1908 Western Reserve football team represented Western Reserve University of Cleveland, Ohio, now known as Case Western Reserve University, during the 1908 college football season.  The team's coach was William B. Seaman .  Assistant coach was Xen C. Scott.

Schedule

References

Western Reserve
Case Western Reserve Spartans football seasons
Western Reserve football